Andrew James Redmayne (born 13 January 1989) is an Australian professional soccer player who plays as a goalkeeper for Sydney FC in the A-League and the Australia men's national team.

Redmayne was born in Gosford and played youth football with the Australian Institute of Sport Football Program before starting his professional career with Central Coast Mariners. After moving to Brisbane Roar in 2010, Redmayne moved to Melbourne Heart (now City) in 2012. In 2015, he transferred to Western Sydney Wanderers.

Redmayne has appeared for Australia at the U-20, U-23, and senior levels.

Early life
Redmayne was born in Gosford, on the Central Coast of New South Wales.

Club career

NSWIS and AIS
Redmayne played youth football with both the New South Wales Institute of Sport and the Australian Institute of Sport. As a result of a NSWIS tour of England, Redmayne had a short trial at Arsenal FC. Despite an initial offer of a move to England, Arsenal withdrew their offer after signing 15-year-old Wojciech Szczęsny instead. His time at the AIS included two seasons in the Victorian Premier League.

Central Coast Mariners

Redmayne signed with hometown club Central Coast Mariners for the 2007–08 A-League. Redmayne made his competitive debut for the club in September 2008, coming on as an early substitute for the injured Mark Bosnich in a win over Perth Glory. Redmayne made his starting debut for the club one week later in a 3–3 draw with Adelaide United.

Redmayne made what was to be his final competitive appearance for the Mariners in January 2010, a 2–0 loss to Wellington Phoenix.

Brisbane Roar
On 18 January 2010 it was announced he would be joining Brisbane Roar after failing to find regular game time at the Mariners. Redmayne made his debut for the club as an 80th-minute substitute for regular goalkeeper Michael Theoklitos in a 4–0 win at home to Gold Coast United. He made a second appearance for the Roar in the side's final match of the 2011–12 A-League regular season – again in a win over Gold Coast United.

Melbourne City
On 21 January 2012, Melbourne Heart announced the Redmayne as their first signing for the 2012–13 A-League season. In January 2013, he made his Heart debut in a victory over Newcastle Jets and was subsequently promoted to first-choice 'keeper at the club.

Western Sydney Wanderers
Redmayne returned to New South Wales to play for Western Sydney Wanderers in 2015.

Sydney FC
In January 2017, Redmayne moved to Sydney FC.

With first choice keeper Danny Vukovic out on international duty, Redmayne made his first appearance for the Sky Blues against Perth Glory keeping a clean sheet in a 3–0 win. With the departure of Vukovic, Redmayne began pre-season as first-choice and starting every match. He started the first game of the season against rivals Melbourne Victory, helping the team to a 1–0 win. He subsequently won the A-League Championship with Sydney in 2019 and again in 2020.

International

Senior
Redmayne was first called up to the Australian national squad in June 2019 for a friendly against South Korea, after his performance in the 2019 A-League Grand Final. He made his international debut in the friendly, playing a full game as Australia lost 1–0.

On 13 June 2022, Redmayne came off the bench in the 120th minute of the FIFA World Cup play-off match against Peru. In the penalty shoot-out, he successfully put off the Peru players and managed to save the vital penalty to help secure Australia's passage to the 2022 FIFA World Cup. In an interview after the game, Redmayne revealed that the tactic had been planned for months.

Career statistics

Club

International

Honours
Brisbane Roar
A-League Premiership: 2010–11
A-League Championship: 2010–11, 2011–12

Sydney FC
A-League Premiership: 2016–17, 2017–18, 2019–20
A-League Championship: 2016–17, 2018–19, 2019–20
FFA Cup: 2017

Australia U20
 AFF U-19 Youth Championship: 2008

Individual
 PFA A-League Team of the Year: 2017–18
 A-League Goalkeeper of the Year: 2019–20
A-Leagues All Star: 2022

Notes

References

External links
 Andrew Redmayne profile WSWanderersFC.com.au
 
 
 

1989 births
Living people
Association football goalkeepers
Australia youth international soccer players
Australia under-20 international soccer players
Australian soccer players
Australia international soccer players
New South Wales Institute of Sport alumni
Australian Institute of Sport soccer players
Central Coast Mariners FC players
Brisbane Roar FC players
Melbourne City FC players
Western Sydney Wanderers FC players
Sydney FC players
Victorian Premier League players
People from Gosford
Sportsmen from New South Wales
Soccer players from New South Wales
2022 FIFA World Cup players